Charles Brown (1849–?) was a U.S. Marine who received the United States' highest honor for bravery, the Medal of Honor. He was born in New York City, and enlisted in the Marine Corps from Hong Kong in June 1870, aboard the warship . His Medal of Honor was approved under General Order No. 169, dated 8 February 1872. 

There is no record of Brown having received his medal, as he deserted from the Marine Corps in Shanghai in October 1871, before the medal was approved.

Medal of Honor citation
Rank and organization: Corporal, U.S. Marine Corps. Born: New York, N.Y. Enlisted at: Hong Kong, China. G.O. No.: 169, 8 February 1872.

Citation:
Assisted in capturing the Korean standard in the center of the Citadel of the Korean Fort, June 11, 1871.

See also

 List of Medal of Honor recipients

Notes

References

Further reading

United States Marine Corps Medal of Honor recipients
United States Marines
Year of death missing
Military personnel from New York City
1849 births
Korean Expedition (1871) recipients of the Medal of Honor
Deserters